HFU may refer to

 Hebei Finance University, in China
 Herbert Fletcher University, a Seventh-Day Adventist distance-learning institution
 Herman Finch University, now Rosalind Franklin University of Medicine and Science, in Illinois, United States
 HiFive Unleashed, a single-board computer
 Hochschule Furtwangen University, in Baden-Württemberg, Germany
 Holy Family University, in Philadelphia, Pennsylvania, United States
 Huafan University, in New Taipei, Taiwan